is the seventh full-length album by Japanese novelty heavy metal band Animetal, released through VAP on October 21, 2005. The album consists of a non-stop marathon of metal covers of various tokusatsu themes: the first three songs are from the newest Super Sentai series at the time of the album's recording, tracks 5-34 are tokusatsu ending themes, and tracks 35-41 are opening themes of solo tokusatsu and Metal Hero Series titles. The last track, "Jump in the Fire!", is a marathon of anime songs adapted from manga published in Weekly Shōnen Jump. Animetal Marathon VII was also the band's final marathon album.

The album peaked at No. 122 on Oricon's weekly albums chart.

Track listing
All tracks are arranged by Animetal.

Personnel
 - Lead vocals
Syu - Guitar
Masaki - Bass

with

Katsuji - Drums

Charts

Footnotes

References

External links

2005 albums
Animetal albums
Japanese-language albums
Covers albums